See Washington Declaration for other documents of this name.

An Evangelical Manifesto, subtitled The Washington Declaration of Evangelical Identity and Public Commitment or simply A Declaration of Evangelical Identity and Public Commitment, is a document issued in Washington DC on May 7, 2008, by a number of evangelical leaders.

Some leaders did not sign the declaration, including on theological grounds.

See also
 Chicago Statement on Biblical Inerrancy
 The Cambridge Declaration

References

External links
 http://www.anevangelicalmanifesto.com Official web site

Evangelical theology